Sebastini is a tribe of marine ray-finned fishes belonging to the subfamily Sebastinae of the family Scorpaenidae in the order Scorpaeniformes.

Taxonomy
Sebastini was first formally recognised as a grouping in 1873 by the German naturalist Johann Jakob Kaup. Authorities who treat the clade referred to as Sebastinae as a family treat the Sebastini as a subfamily and call this grouping Sebastinae.

Genera
Sebastini contains four genera with 120 species, most in Sebastes.

 Helicolenus Goode & Bean, 1896
 Hozukius Matsubara, 1934
 Sebastes Cuvier, 1829
 Sebastiscus Jordan & Starks, 1904

References

 
Sebastinae
Taxa named by Johann Jakob Kaup
Fish tribes